Satish Mahana (born 14 October 1960) is an Indian politician and Member of the Legislative Assembly of Uttar Pradesh. Currently, he is serving as Speaker of the Legislative Assembly. He is a seven time MLA from Kanpur Cantt, having served since the 11th Legislative Assembly, and currently represents Maharajpur constituency of Kanpur. He participated in the 2009 general elections as a BJP candidate from Kanpur. He was the Vice Leader of Bharatiya Janata Party in 16th Vidhan Sabha of Uttar Pradesh and he is a former coordinator of Bajrang Dal youth wing of Vishva Hindu Parishad at Kanpur Purvottar District.

Early life and education
Mahana was born on 14 October 1960 in Kanpur, Uttar Pradesh to his father Ram Avtar Mahana, in a Hindu Khatri family. In 1981 he married Anita Mahana, they have one son Karan Mahana and one daughter Neha Mahana. He did his early schooling from St. Joseph's Senior Secondary School, Kanpur. He attended the Kanpur University and attained Bachelor of Science degree.

Political career
Mahana has been MLA  for 8 straight terms. He served as Minister of State for Housing and Urban Developing from 27 October 1997 to 8 March 2002 but because of his good work he was again given the post of Minister of State for Housing. After 2012, he represents Maharajpur (Uttar Pradesh Assembly constituency) of Kanpur Nagar district of Uttar Pradesh. In 2017 elections, he defeated his nearest rival Bahujan Samaj Party candidate Manoj Kumar Shukla by a record margin of 91,826 votes.

In March 2017, he was appointed Cabinet Minister in Yogi Adityanath Cabinet. He got ministry of Industrial Development in Uttar Pradesh Government.The Slogan 'Jiske Sath Jamana hai, uska naam mahana hai' also related to him.

Posts held

References

Politicians from Kanpur
1960 births
Living people
Uttar Pradesh MLAs 2012–2017
Uttar Pradesh MLAs 2017–2022
Bharatiya Janata Party politicians from Uttar Pradesh
State cabinet ministers of Uttar Pradesh
Yogi ministry
Uttar Pradesh MLAs 1991–1993
Uttar Pradesh MLAs 1993–1996
Uttar Pradesh MLAs 1997–2002
Uttar Pradesh MLAs 2002–2007
Uttar Pradesh MLAs 2007–2012
Uttar Pradesh MLAs 2022–2027